Atlético Roraima Clube, also known as Atlético Roraima, or just Roraima, are a Brazilian football team from Boa Vista, Roraima. They competed in the Série C in 1995 and in the Série D in 2009.

Atlético is currently ranked fourth among Roraima teams in CBF's national club ranking, at 185th place overall.

History
Atlético Roraima Clube were founded on October 1, 1944. They won the state championship eighteen times. They competed in the Série C in 1995, when they were eliminated in the second stage by Nacional. Roraima competed in the Série D in 2009 when they were eliminated in the first stage of the competition.

Stadium
Roraima play their home games at Estádio Flamarion Vasconcelos, commonly known as Canarinho. The stadium has a maximum capacity of 10,000 people.

Achievements

 Campeonato Roraimense:
 Winners (18): 1975, 1976, 1978, 1980, 1981, 1983, 1985, 1987, 1990, 1993, 1995, 1998, 2001, 2002, 2003, 2007, 2008, 2009
Runners-up (3): 2000, 2004, 2005

References

External links
 Atlético Roraima Clube official website

Football clubs in Roraima
Atletico Roraima Clube
Association football clubs established in 1944
Atlético Roraima Clube